The Inter-Agency Space Debris Coordination Committee (IADC) is an inter-governmental forum whose aim is to co-ordinate efforts to deal with debris in orbit around the Earth founded in 1993.

Members 
 Agenzia Spaziale Italiana (ASI)
 Centre National d'Etudes Spatiales (CNES)
 China National Space Administration (CNSA)
 Canadian Space Agency (CSA)
 German Aerospace Center (DLR)
 European Space Agency (ESA)
 Indian Space Research Organisation (ISRO)
 Japan Aerospace Exploration Agency (JAXA)
 Korea Aerospace Research Institute (KARI)
 National Aeronautics and Space Administration (NASA)
 Russian Federal Space Agency (ROSCOSMOS)
 State Space Agency of Ukraine (SSAU)
 United Kingdom Space Agency (UKSA)

See also 

 Orbital Debris Co-ordination Working Groupっっっっｍش

External links 
 Web Archive: Report of the IADC Activities on Space Debris Mitigation Measures (PDF, 129kB)

Space organizations
Space debris